Villalobos may refer to:

Villalobos (Spain), a municipality located in the province of Zamora, Spain
Villalobos (surname), a Spanish surname
Villalobos Expedition, a Spanish expedition to the East Indies in the 1540s
Villalobos River, a river in Guatemala
Villalobos Brothers, a Mexican band
USS Villalobos (PG-42), a steel screw gunboat originally built for the Spanish Navy
Vega de Villalobos, a municipality located in the province of Zamora, Spain
Villalobos Rescue Center, a rescue center for pit bulls in Louisiana
Colégio Villalobos, a college in Sao Paulo, Brazil